Monica Lăzăruț (born 13 July 1977) is a Romanian cross-country skier. She competed in four events at the 1998 Winter Olympics.

References

External links
 

1977 births
Living people
Romanian female cross-country skiers
Olympic cross-country skiers of Romania
Cross-country skiers at the 1998 Winter Olympics
People from Bistrița-Năsăud County